The Trinidad Broadcasting Company (TBC) Radio Network is a network of radio stations in Trinidad and Tobago and Guyana owned and operated by Guardian Media Limited. It is headquartered at 22-24 St. Vincent Street, Port of Spain, Trinidad and Tobago, W.I.

Radio Stations in Trinidad and Tobago

 95 The Ultimate One
 The Vibe CT 105.1 FM
 Sangeet 106.1 FM
 Freedom 106.5
 Slam 100.5
 Sky 99.5

Defunct Radio Stations
 Radio Trinidad

Radio Stations in Guyana
 Mix 90.1FM

External links
Network History ANSA McAL
Network history Re Diffusion

Mass media in Trinidad and Tobago
Mass media companies of Trinidad and Tobago
Radio networks
Radio in Trinidad and Tobago